Liu Ba (died 222), courtesy name Zichu, was an official in the state of Shu Han during the Three Kingdoms period of China. He originally served under the warlord Liu Zhang before becoming a subordinate of Liu Bei (the founding emperor of Shu) after Liu Zhang's surrender to Liu Bei in 214. Liu Ba was instrumental in helping Liu Bei reward his subordinates from the treasury without impoverishing the common people after their conquest of Yi Province. Liu Ba also helped write the Shu Ke, the legal code of Shu, along with Zhuge Liang, Fa Zheng, Li Yan and Yi Ji. Liu Ba succeeded Fa Zheng as the Prefect of the Masters of Writing in 220 and held office until his death in 222.

Early life
Liu Ba's was from Zhengyang (烝陽) prefecture in Lingling (零陵) commandery. At a young age, he was already promising and famous in the province.

Liu Ba's grandfather, Yao (曜) was the administrator of Cangwu Commandery. While his father, Xiang (祥) was the administrator of Jiangxia (江夏) and Annihilating Bandits General (盪寇將軍). When Sun Jian raised some troops to attack Dong Zhuo, he killed the administrator of Nanyang (南陽). Zhang Zi (張咨) for refusing to supply grains to his army. Liu Ba's father was friendly with Sun Jian so by association the elites and the people of Nanyang started to dislike him. Soon they revolted and led an army against him. They battled and Liu Xiang was defeated and killed. Liu Biao also didn't like Liu Xiang so he detained Liu Ba and wished to kill him. Repeatedly, he sent one of Xiang's trusted friend to deceive Liu Ba saying to him "Governor Liu Biao wishes to kill you however you can escape with me." Although this happened several times, Liu Ba didn't fall for his trick. Soon it was reported to Liu Biao who then did not kill Liu Ba.

Adulthood
When he reached eighteen years old, Liu Ba was appointed as clerk in the Household Department, secretary clerk and master of records. At this time, Liu Xian (劉先) wanted to have Zhou Buyi (周不疑) study with Liu Ba. However Liu Ba replied :

Service with Cao Cao
Liu Biao wanted to have Liu Ba appointed as a member of his staff and recommended him for the title of Abundant Talent.  However Liu Ba refused both of his propositions. When Liu Biao died and Cao Cao attacked the province of Jing, Liu Bei fled south of the Yangtze with all the nobles and officials of Jing and Chu joining him.  Liu Ba didn't follow Liu Bei south.  Rather, he went north to join Cao Cao. Cao Cao appointed him to his staff as a Division Chief and sent him with the mission to convince Lingling, Changsha and Guiyang commanderies to submit.

At this time Cao Cao has been defeated at Wulin (烏林). While returning to the north, he wanted to employ Huang Jie for a mission.  However Huan Jie declined and told him that he could not match Liu Ba. Liu Ba said to Cao Cao "Right now, Liu Bei is taking over Jing Province, this is not acceptable." Cao Cao answered "If Liu Bei plans against me then I would go after him with the might of my Six Armies."

However Liu Bei already had the three commanderies subjugated and so Liu Ba was unable to accomplish his mission and instead moved to the Jiachi commandery. Liu Bei deeply regretted not having Liu Ba join him.

When Liu Ba was moving to Lingling but was unsuccessful and so he wished to move back to Jiao Province. When he was leaving for the capital, he knew that Zhuge Liang was at this time in Lingzheng so he wrote to him : Zhuge Liang quickly wrote him back : Liu Ba answered "I have received an order, came and was unsuccessful for now I'm going back. This is the righteous way. What else are you speaking of?"

Joining Liu Zhang
When Liu Ba entered Jiao Province, he changed his surname to Zhang. He met and talked with the governor of the province Shi Xie however both of them were in disagreement. And therefore left the province by the Zangke road for Yi Province. He was detained in Yizhou commandery with the administrator wishing to kill him however the master of records said "This man is not an ordinary person, you cannot kill him." The master of records then asked to personally escort Liu Ba to the province seat and meet his governor Liu Zhang. Liu Zhang's father, Liu Yan, in the past was recommended as filial and incorruptible by Liu Ba's father, Xiang. Hence when Liu Zhang met Liu Ba, he was surprised and pleased. Every time there was a great affair, Liu Zhang would consult Liu Ba.

However Pei Songzhi remarked that when Emperor Ling of Han was emperor, Liu Yan was already the director of the imperial clan and grand master of ceremonies and that when he was sent to be the governor of Yi Province, Liu Xiang was just the administrator of Jianxia with Sun Jian having Chansha. Hence he believes that Liu Xiang could not recommend Liu Yan as filial and incorruptible.

Advices against Liu Bei
When Liu Zhang sent Fa Zheng to welcome Liu Bei. Liu Ba reprimanded him as such "Liu Bei is known as a hero. If you let him in Yi province, he will surely bring you misfortune. You have to stop him." After Liu Bei was in the province, Liu Ba once again reprimanded Liu Zhang "If you send him against Zhang Lu, it would be like releasing a tiger in the mountains and forests." However Liu Zhang wouldn't listen and so Liu Ba stopped leaving his house and claimed illness. When Liu Bei surrounded Chengdu, he ordered inside the armies that anyone who would harm Liu Ba would suffer execution to third degrees. When Liu Bei finally met him, he was deeply happy.

Service under Liu Bei
Soon Yi Province was conquered by Liu Bei. And Liu Ba apologized to him but Liu Bei did not hold him culpable. Moreover, Zhuge Liang repeatedly praised and recommended him for high position so Liu Bei appointed him to his own staff as Left General's West Department Official Head.

Conflict with Zhang Fei
Zhang Fei once visited Liu Ba's home. However, Liu Ba refused to speak with him. Because of this, Zhang Fei was angered and furious. And so Zhuge Liang said to Liu Ba "Although Zhang Fei is a martial person, he deeply admires and respects you. Right now, Lord Liu Bei needs to gather many civil and military officers to help him accomplish his great mission. Even if you are a man of high moral and bright talents, you should be less condescending of others." Liu Ba's reply to Zhuge Liang was "When a real man is born in this world, he must associate himself with the greatest heroes. How can someone like you speak with a mere soldier?"

When he heard of this conversation, Liu Bei was furious. He said "I wish to secure the realm under Heaven. However, Zichu (Liu Ba) wishes to throw it into disorder. His desire is to leave and return North; he is only borrowing this road. How could he help me settle my affairs?" Liu Bei also said "Zichu's ability and wisdom are far superior to any men. However even if I can employ him, I fear others wouldn't be able to." Zhuge Liang further said about Liu Ba "In logistics planning and strategies inside the tent curtains, I'm not the equal of Zichu. However if it's about beating the drums, gathering the army encampments and encouraging the common people to do their utmost, I can discuss this with others."

Managing Liu Bei's economy
When Liu Bei started his campaign against Liu Zhang, he made a pact with his armies and troops "If our great entreprise is successful then the government treasury with all his goods shall be all yours." And so when his army took Chengdu, all the soldiers threw away their shields and spears and compete with one another to the various stores to take valuable items. Soon the military supplies were falling and Liu Bei was deeply worried about this. Liu Ba told him "It is simple! You simply have to cast bars worth a hundred coins, have the price for them stable and order your officials to manage the government markets." Liu Bei followed his advise and within several months, all the government treasury was full again.

Service under Shu Han
In 219, Liu Bei declared himself King of Hanzhong and Liu Ba was promoted to be the Master of Writing and soon took Fa Zheng's position as Prefect of the Masters of Writing. Liu Ba himself conducted with purity and integrity. He would not engage in the management of property or production. Moreover, because he was not originally an officer of Liu Bei, he feared that he would face jealousy, doubt and suspicion. Liu Ba was also respectful and always kept his composure. He was tranquil and had no personal dealings, and would speak of nothing but official business.

Around this time, the people of the central plains were not of the same mind. Everyone was looking in Yi's direction to see what Liu Bei would do, but Liu Bei was firm in his imperial ambition while Liu Ba did not think that Liu Bei should take the imperial throne yet and wanted him to change his mind. He joined with the Master of Records Yong Mao (雍茂) to disagree with Liu Bei. Later, Liu Bei used another problem as an excuse to have Yong Mao killed. And so people from far away stopped joining him.

Liu Qingzhi (劉清植) remarked that all the documents, orders and decrees cited in Liu Bei's biography were written by Liu Ba because of his position. Hence, Liu Qingzhi believed that Liu Ba would not have been opposed to Liu Bei's assuming the imperial throne. He also says that the Traditions of the Former Worthies would have used critical language when speaking of people of the enemy state and that it should not be trusted.

When Liu Bei took the title of Emperor, Liu Ba reported it to the Imperial Heaven God Above and Lordly Earth Divine Spirit. All the various writings such as the documents, admonitions and decrees were all written by Liu Ba. He died in the second year of Zhangwu (222). After his death, when the Supervisor of the Masters of Writing Chen Qun of Wei wrote to Zhuge Liang asking for words of Liu Ba, in the letter, Chen Qun referred to him as "Lord Liu Zichu" (劉君子初), so great was Chen's respect for him.

Anecdote with Zhang Zhao and Sun Quan
The Wu general who assists the state, Zhang Zhao, once criticized Liu Ba, saying to Sun Quan that he was narrow minded and should not have refused Zhang Fei so extremely. Sun Quan's reply to Zhang Zhao was "If Zichu had chosen to follow the world in being superficial and only acting to please Liu Bei dealing with improper persons, then how could he be worthy to be praised as a lingshi (令士; a virtuous scholarly gentleman)?"

Appraisal
Chen Shou, who wrote Liu Ba's biography in the Records of the Three Kingdoms (Sanguozhi), appraised Liu Ba as follows: "Liu Ba followed the integrity of the pure and exalted.... Along with Dong He, Ma Liang, Chen Zhen and Dong Yun, he was one of the best officials in Shu."

See also
 Lists of people of the Three Kingdoms

Notes

References 

 Chen, Shou (3rd century). Records of the Three Kingdoms (Sanguozhi), Volume 39, Biography of Liu Ba.
 Pei, Songzhi (5th century). Annotations to Records of the Three Kingdoms (Sanguozhi zhu).

Year of birth unknown
222 deaths
Shu Han politicians
Liu Zhang and associates
Officials under Liu Bei
Officials under Cao Cao
Politicians from Shaoyang
Han dynasty politicians from Hunan